Brian Keith Hagedorn (born January 21, 1978) is an American lawyer and a justice of the Wisconsin Supreme Court, serving since 2019. Prior to his election to the Supreme Court, he served four years as a judge on the Wisconsin Court of Appeals in the Waukesha-based District II.

Early life and education 
A Milwaukee, Wisconsin, native, Hagedorn graduated from Trinity International University in 2000 and was employed by Hewitt Associates before receiving his J.D. degree from Northwestern University in 2006. At Northwestern, Hagedorn was president of the school's Federalist Society chapter.

Career

Early years 
Hagedorn was an attorney at the Milwaukee firm Foley & Lardner until 2009, when he was appointed as a law clerk to Wisconsin Supreme Court Justice Michael Gableman. In 2010, Hagedorn was employed as an assistant attorney general in the Wisconsin Department of Justice, under Attorney General J. B. Van Hollen.

In December 2010, Hagedorn was appointed chief legal counsel to the Republican Governor-elect Scott Walker. He remained in that office through July 2015. As chief legal counsel, Hagedorn was a drafter of Walker's controversial Wisconsin Budget Repair Bill of 2011, and, in 2014, he served as appointing authority for defense counsel hired to represent state prosecutors sued by targets of a John Doe probe into Walker's staff.

Wisconsin Court of Appeals 
On July 30, 2015, Walker appointed Hagedorn to the Wisconsin Court of Appeals to be chambered in the Waukesha-based District II. Hagedorn took office on August 1, 2015 and replaced retiring Chief Judge Richard S. Brown, who had served on the Court of Appeals since it was created in 1978.

Wisconsin Supreme Court

In 2019 Hagedorn ran for a seat on the Wisconsin Supreme Court to succeed retiring Justice Shirley Abrahamson, who had served on the court since 1976. His opponent in the election was Lisa Neubauer, Chief Judge of the Wisconsin Court of Appeals.

Based on unofficial results in the nonpartisan general election, Hagedorn originally led by 5,962 votes out of 1.2 million cast, a margin of about 0.5%, and a post-election canvas increased his lead slightly to around 6,100 votes. Under state law, Neubauer could have requested a recount as long as the difference in votes in the final tally was less than 1%, but Neubauer would have had to fund the recount herself because the difference was greater than 0.25%, which is the margin that triggers a taxpayer-funded recount. Instead, Neubauer conceded to Hagedorn.

Hagedorn was inaugurated on August 1, 2019.  After several of his early decisions went contrary to the conservative majority of the court, the Associated Press theorized that Hagedorn could become a swing vote on the Court after the inauguration of liberal justice Jill Karofsky in August 2020.  That analysis was borne out throughout 2020, as Hagedorn's vote was decisive on politically-sensitive cases on the COVID-19 pandemic in Wisconsin and election-related cases before and after the 2020 election.  He has since come under criticism from his former Supreme Court colleague, conservative justice Daniel Kelly, who accused Hagedorn of trying to seek political neutrality when considering the implications of his rulings.

2019–2020 Voter purge case

In a case involving attempts by conservative groups to force the state Elections Commission to purge more than 230,000 voters from the active voter rolls, Hagedorn sided with the liberal justices' position that the Court should not review a lower court's opinion which had halted the purge. Hagedorn's decision resulted in a 3–3 tie on the Court, due to Justice Daniel Kelly's recusal, leaving the lower court ruling in place.

COVID-19 pandemic

In May 2020, Hagedorn dissented from the conservative majority's decision to invalidate Governor Tony Evers' stay-at-home order in the midst of the COVID-19 pandemic in the United States. He wrote of the majority opinion, "We are not here to do freewheeling constitutional theory. We are not here to step in and referee every intractable political stalemate. In striking down most of (the order), this court has strayed from its charge and turned this case into something quite different than the case brought to us." Conservatives, including outgoing justice Daniel Kelly, subsequently expressed disappointment with Hagedorn.

In November 2020, while COVID-19 cases were surging in Wisconsin, he was in the Wisconsin Supreme Court's conservative majority that prevented the City of Racine Public Health Department to order school closures. In March 2021, Hagedorn was in the Wisconsin Supreme Court's conservative majority that prevented Governor Tony Evers from extending a face mask mandate intended to halt the spread of the coronavirus.

2020 Green Party ballot access

In the lead-up to the mailing of absentee ballots for the 2020 election, Hagedorn again sided with the three liberal justices in a critical case keeping the Green Party candidates, Howie Hawkins and Angela Nicole Walker, off of the 2020 ballot in Wisconsin.  The Green Party had missed several deadlines to file corrections and responses to errors with their nominating papers, leaving the Wisconsin Elections Commission unable to add the Greens to the ballot.

Just days before ballots were due to be sent out, however, the Greens sued for ballot access with the assistance of several Republican lawyers, and the conservative majority on the Wisconsin Supreme Court took up their case, forcing a state-wide pause in the printing and mailing of ballots.  This appeared to be part of a larger Republican effort—along with their propping up of the Kanye West presidential campaign and the sabotage of the U.S. Postal Service—to dilute the anti-Trump vote and disrupt absentee voting.  

Hagedorn's decision to side with the liberal justices allowed the state to avoid the logistical difficulty that would have resulted from having to re-design and re-print more than a million ballots, which would have all-but-guaranteed that county clerks would have missed the deadline to send the ballots to voters.

2020 Election challenges
Following the 2020 United States presidential election, the defeated incumbent, President Donald Trump, launched a number of lawsuits in several states where the official vote tally showed his opponent Joe Biden as the victor.  On December 1, 2020, coinciding with the Governor's certification of Wisconsin's election results—showing Biden as the victor by about 20,000 votes—President Trump's legal team petitioned the Wisconsin Supreme Court to intervene on his behalf to throw out hundreds of thousands of those votes.  On December 3, Justice Hagedorn again sided with the court's liberal minority, voting to reject the petition from President Trump's campaign on the procedural error that, according to Wisconsin law, any election challenges must originate in the Wisconsin Circuit Courts.  Justice Hagedorn said of his decision, "We do well as a judicial body to abide by time-tested judicial norms, even—and maybe especially—in high-profile cases."

Redistricting cases (2021–2022)
In 2021, the Wisconsin Legislature and Governor failed to agree on new redistricting maps to account for the 2020 United States census, so the issue was brought to the Wisconsin Supreme Court.  Hagedorn sided with the Republican majority on the court in the initial decision that the new maps should only consider map submissions from the litigants which presented minimal changes to the existing maps.  Since the existing maps heavily favored Republicans, this was regarded as a win for the Republican Party of Wisconsin.  However, when the court decided on the final maps, in March 2022, Hagedorn sided with the court's liberals to choose Democratic Governor Tony Evers' map submission. The resultant map is still predicted to be heavily skewed toward Republicans—since it conforms with the court's "least change" requirement—but less so than the 2011 map or the Republican proposals for 2022. After the U.S. Supreme Court rejected Evers's map, Hagedorn voted with the conservatives on the Wisconsin Supreme Court to uphold a proposed redistricting plan by Wisconsin Republican state lawmakers. The map was heavily gerrymandered in favor of Republicans, as 63 of the 99 Assembly seats and 23 of the 33 Senate seats leaned towards Republicans.

Views on LGBT rights 
In the mid-2000s, while Hagedorn was in law school, he argued that the Supreme Court ruling that found that anti-sodomy laws were unconstitutional could lead to legalized bestiality (citing the dissent of Justice Antonin Scalia). In an October 2005 blog post that criticized the Supreme Court's decision in Lawrence v. Texas, he stated that "..render[ing] laws prohibiting bestiality unconstitutional [because] the idea of homosexual behavior is different than bestiality as a constitutional matter is unjustifiable". He also argued that gay pride month created "a hostile work environment for Christians."

Hagedorn was paid more than $3,000 to give speeches between 2015 and 2017 to Alliance Defending Freedom, a Christian right legal group known for its anti-LGBT views; the group has supported criminalizing sodomy and advocated for sterilizing transgender people.  In 2004, as a law student, Hagedorn was an intern for the group, then known as the Alliance Defense Fund.

In 2016, Hagedorn founded the Augustine Academy in Merton, Wisconsin, a private K-6 Christian school. The school's code of conduct bars teachers, parents and students from "participating in immoral sexual activity", which is defined as any form of touching or nudity for the purpose of evoking sexual arousal apart from the context of marriage between one man and one woman. Teachers who violate the policy can be dismissed and students can be expelled for their or their parents' actions. The school's "Statement of Faith" states that "Adam and Eve were made to complement each other in a one-flesh union that establishes the only normative pattern of sexual relations for men and women," and "..., men and women are not simply interchangeable, nor is gender subject to one's personal preferences." In February 2019, after newspaper reports about these policies, the Wisconsin Realtors Association withdrew its support for Hagedorn and asked him to return an $18,000 donation it had made to him in January 2019, in his campaign for the Wisconsin Supreme Court.

Electoral history

Wisconsin Court of Appeals (2017)

| colspan="6" style="text-align:center;background-color: #e9e9e9;"| General Election, April 4, 2017

Wisconsin Supreme Court (2019)

| colspan="6" style="text-align:center;background-color: #e9e9e9;"| General Election, April 2, 2019

References

External links 
 Brian Hagedorn at Wisconsin Vote
 
 
 The Augustine Academy

|-

Federalist Society members
Justices of the Wisconsin Supreme Court
Lawyers from Milwaukee
Living people
Northwestern University Pritzker School of Law alumni
Trinity International University alumni
Wisconsin Court of Appeals judges
Year of birth missing (living people)
1978 births